This article contains detailed results of the parliamentary election that was held as part of the Kenyan general election in December 2007. Those elected sat in the 10th Parliament of Kenya.

Results

Summary
207 members of parliament were elected. Elections have to be repeated in 3 constituencies. 12 additional mps will be nominated by the president which is expected to be done according to the strength of parties in the house.

PNU and affiliated parties held 78 seats (PNU 43, KANU 16, other affiliated parties 21).
ODM and its affiliated party NARC held 102 seats (ODM itself 99).
ODM-K held 16 seats.
11 candidates reached parliament who were elected under small parties which had so far not yet declared an affiliation to any of the blocks.

Kenyan press reported that 30 mps of small parties formed "Small Parties Parliamentary Group" which would include some members who are counted above as affiliated to PNU.

Nairobi Province
ODM: 5, PNU: 2 (plus one repeat election)

Central Province
PNU: 18, Safina: 3, KANU: 2, Sisi kwa sisi: 2, FORD-A: 1, FORD-P: 1, PICK: 1
PPK

Eastern Province
ODM-K: 14, PNU: 7, KANU: 4, CCU: 2, NARC: 2, ODM: 2, DP: 1, NARC KENYA: 1, PICK: 1, SAFINA: 1, Mazingira: 1

Western Province
ODM: 18, PNU: 2, New Ford-K: 2, FORD K: 1, KADDU: 1

Nyanza Province
ODM: 25, KANU: 2, NARC: 1, NLP: 1, DP: 1, FORD_P: 1, PDP: 1

Coast Province
ODM: 12, PNU: 3, NARC-K: 2, ODM-K: 1, FORD-P: 1, KADU ASILI: 1, KANU: 1

Rift Valley Province
ODM: 32,  PNU: 11,  Kanu: 1, Kenda: 1, NARC-K: 1, UDM: 1

North Eastern
Kanu: 4, ODM: 5; Safina: 1

References

Parliamentary results per Province - Government Homepage

See also
2007 in Kenya
2007 Kenyan general election
National Assembly of Kenya
Political parties in Kenya

2007 Kenyan elections
Election results in Kenya